Goodenia heterophylla is a species of plant in the family Goodeniaceae and is endemic to eastern Australia. It is an erect to trailing, more or less woody herb or shrub with linear to egg-shaped stem-leaves and racemes or thyrses of yellow flowers.

Description
The leaves at the base of the plant are ephemeral.

Taxonomy
Goodenia heterophylla was first formally described in 1794 by English botanist James Edward Smith in Transactions of the Linnean Society of London from specimens collected by John White at Port Jackson.
The species was first formally described by English botanist James Edward Smith in 1794 in Transactions of the Linnean Society of London.

In 1990, Roger Charles Carolin described four subspecies in the journal Telopea, and the names are accepted by the Australian Plant Census:
 Goodenia heterophylla subsp. eglandulosa Carolin, an ascending to erect herb that differs from the autonym in lacking glandular hairs and having serrated, egg-shaped leaves;
 Goodenia heterophylla subsp. teucriifolia (F.Muell.)

Distribution and habitat
This goodenia grows in forest and woodland, often on sandstone. Subspecies eglandulosa occurs in coastal and tableland areas of New South Wales from near Wauchope to Jervis Bay in New South Wales. Subspecies heterophylla is mostly found between Gloucester and Lithgow in New South Wales but sometimes also in north eastern Victoria. Subspecies montana is found in forest between Lithgow and the Nerriga area and subsp. teucriifolia is restricted to the Glass House Mountains area in Queensland.

References

heterophylla
Flora of New South Wales
Flora of Victoria (Australia)
Flora of Queensland
Taxa named by James Edward Smith
Plants described in 1794